The Suvraga Khairkhan (stupa holy mountain) is a mountain of the Khangai Mountains range in the Tsenkher, Arkhangai Province in Mongolia.

The Suvraga Khairkhan is the pivotal point between the watersheds of the Orkhon, Tamir and Tsetserleg rivers, with the main source of the Orkhon right at its foot to the south, and tributaries of the other two to the west and north.

References 

Mountains of Mongolia